Ollie Kirkby (September 26, 1886 – October 7, 1964) was an American stage, screen, and vaudeville actress.

Biography
She was born in Philadelphia, Pennsylvania, in 1886 and died in 1964 at Glendale, California. Her entire career, from 1914 to 1925, was dedicated to making short films or film serials. She was known for the dimple on her shoulder and often photographed showing that distinguishing feature.

Kirkby began working in films with Kalem in 1912. After two years there, she worked for Favorite Players Company for a year and then returned to Kalem.

She married actor George Larkin in 1918. He died in 1946. 

In addition to her acting career, she also wrote scripts with her husband, including Bulldog Courage (1922) and The Pell Street Mystery (1924).

Selected filmography

The Parasite (1912)
The Girl and the Gangster (1913) – short
The Wiles of a Siren (1914) – short
The Potter and the Clay (1914) – short
The Key to Yesterday (1914)
The Last Chapter (1914)
The Girl Detective (1915) – episodes 16 & 17
The Trap Door (1915) – short
The Voice from the Taxi (1915) – short
The Tattooed Hand (1915) – short
The Clairvoyant Swindlers (1915) – short
Scotty Weed's Alibi (1915) – short
The Closed Door (1915) – short
The Figure in Black (1915) – short
The Money Leeches (1915) – short
The Vanishing Vases (1915) – short
The Accomplice (1915) – short
The Frame-Up (1915) – short
The Straight and Narrow Path (1915) – short
The Strangler's Cord (1915) – short
Mysteries of the Grand Hotel (1915) – short
The Disappearing Necklace (1915) – short
The Secret Code (1915) – short
The Riddle of the Rings (1915) – short
The Substituted Jewel (1915) – short
The Barnstormers (1915) – short
The False Clue (1915) – short
The Wolf's Prey (1915) – short
The Man on Watch (1915) – short
The Man in Irons (1915) – short
Stingaree (1915)
The Social Pirates (1916)
Black Magic (1916) – short
The Code Letter (1916) – short
The Missing Heiress (1916) – short
The Pencil Clue (1916) – short
Grant, Police Reporter (1916) – short
The Man from Yukon (1916) – short
The Rogue's Pawn (1916) – short
The House of Three Deuces (1916) – short
 The Tango Cavalier (1923)
The Apache Dancer (1923) as Babette
Stop at Nothing (1924 film) as Slick Sadie alias Ted Norton
Deeds of Daring (1924)
Yankee Madness (1924)
The Right Man (1925)
Getting 'Em Right (1925)
 Never Too Late (1925)

References

External links

1886 births
1964 deaths
American stage actresses
American film actresses
American silent film actresses
Actresses from Philadelphia
20th-century American actresses